Pamarru Mandal is one of the 25 Mandals in Krishna district of the Indian state of Andhra Pradesh. It is under the administration of Gudivada revenue division and the headquarters are located at Pamarru. The mandal is bounded by Pamidimukkala, Pedaparupudi, Movva, Gudur, Gudlavalleru and Gudivada Mandals of Krishna District.

Administration 
The Pamarru mandal is partially a part of the Andhra Pradesh Capital Region under the jurisdiction of APCRDA.

Towns and villages 

 census, the mandal has 25 settlements and all are 29 villages. The settlements in the mandal are listed below:

Note: †–Mandal Headquarters, M-Municipality

See also 
List of villages in Krishna district

References 

Mandals in Krishna district